SN 2004dj was the brightest supernova since SN 1987A at the time of its discovery.

This Type II-P supernova was discovered by Koichi Itagaki, a Japanese astronomer on July 31, 2004. At the time of its discovery, its apparent brightness was 11.2 visual magnitude; the discovery occurred after the supernova had reached its peak magnitude. The supernova's progenitor is a star in a young, compact star cluster in the galaxy NGC 2403, in Camelopardalis. The cluster had been cataloged as the 96th object in a list of luminous stars and clusters by Allan Sandage in 1984; the progenitor is therefore commonly referred to as Sandage 96. This cluster is easily visible in a Kitt Peak National Observatory image and appears starlike.

External links
 Light curves and spectra on the Open Supernova Catalog
 supernovae.net image collection
 
 Bright Supernova page on 2004dj

References

20040731
Camelopardalis (constellation)